GPA may refer to:

Education 
 Grade point average
 Grace Preparatory Academy, in Arlington, Texas, United States
 Government Polytechnic Amravati, in Maharashtra, India

Government and politics 
 Agreement on Government Procurement of the World Trade Organization
 Gambia Ports Authority
 Georgia Ports Authority, in the U.S. state of Georgia
 Government Property Agency (Hong Kong)
 Government Property Agency (United Kingdom)
 Green Party of Alberta
 Guam Power Authority

Science and medicine 
 Generalized Procrustes analysis
 Geometric phase analysis
 Gigapascal (GPa), a unit of pressure
 Glenopolar angle
 Gradient pattern analysis
 Granulomatosis with polyangiitis
 Gravida/para/abortus, in medicine
 Gravity Probe A (GP-A), an experiment to test the theory of general relativity 
 Guanidinopropionic acid
 Proton affinity

Sport 
 Gaelic Players Association
 Gambia Ports Authority FC
 Gibraltar Pistol Association
 Gross Production Average, in baseball

Other uses 
 GPA (company), a Brazilian retailer
 Araxos Airport, serving Patras, Greece
 Ford GPA, an amphibious vehicle
 Gay Police Association, in the United Kingdom
 Global Peace Agency, a fictional DC Comics organization
 Guinness Peat Aviation, a defunct Irish company
 GNU Privacy Assistant, a graphical frontend to GNU Privacy Guard
 Personal Service Workers' Union, a former Austrian trade union